Rodney H. C. G. Tam (October 3, 1953 – May 15, 2019) was an American businessman and politician from the state of Hawaii.

Biography
Born in Honolulu, Tam attended California State University and Kapiolani Community College. He received his bachelor's degree from University of Hawaii at Manoa.

Career 
Tam began his career as a budget and research analyst, and was also involved with the life insurance business. Tam became a Democratic representative of the Hawaii House of Representatives in 1982. Following a twelve-year term, he was appointed as a member of the state's Senate in 1992, serving until 2002. He was elected to the Honolulu city council before leaving office in 2010 in an unsuccessful bid to become the city's mayor.

In 2016, Tam made a return to politics as a Republican, running for the office of the Hawaii Senate representing District 13. He lost the election to Democrat Karl Rhoads, receiving a total of 3,824 (25.1%) votes.

Controversy 
In November 2011, Tam pleaded guilty to stealing money from the city and violating campaign spending laws, and sentenced to two days in jail and 338 hours of community service.

Death 
In January 2019, Tam was diagnosed with leukemia, and died of complications of the disease on May 15, 2019, at the age of 65. He was survived by his wife, Lynette, and their two children.

References

1953 births
2019 deaths
Businesspeople from Hawaii
Politicians from Honolulu
California State University alumni
University of Hawaiʻi at Mānoa alumni
Hawaii Democrats
Hawaii Republicans
Members of the Hawaii House of Representatives
Hawaii state senators
Honolulu City Council members
Hawaii politicians convicted of crimes
Deaths from leukemia
Deaths from cancer in Hawaii
21st-century American politicians
20th-century American politicians
20th-century American businesspeople